Vijaya Rajasinha (Sinhala: ශ්‍රී විජය රාජසිංහ, Tamil: விஜய ராஜசின்ஹா; reigned 1739–1747) was a member of the Madurai Nayak Dynasty and succeeded his brother-in-law Vira Narendra Sinha as the King of Kandy.

See also
 Mahavamsa
 List of monarchs of Sri Lanka
 History of Sri Lanka

Sources
 Kings & Rulers of Sri Lanka

1747 deaths
Year of birth unknown
Monarchs of Kandy
Vijaya
Vijaya
S